GI Jill (born Martha Wilkerson, 4 May 1918 — 1999) was an American disc jockey and host of GI Jive, a music program on the Armed Forces Radio Service during World War II. She was notable for her positive effect of her personality and music selections on American troops' morale and for being "universally credited with being the No. 1 overseas attraction" on AFRS. By the end of January 1945 she had made 870 broadcasts.

Background
Jill was born Martha Wilkerson, but she never gave her real name on the air, nor did listeners know that she was married and had a young family. Mort Werner, her husband, was an executive in broadcasting and advertising, and he produced some of her programs. She had a brother who was a lieutenant in the Navy, and her inability to get letters through to him led to the development of her broadcasts.

Like an actress playing a role, Wilkerson considered Jill a separate entity. In 1966, she told a reporter: "The men overseas created Jill. They made her what they wanted her to be — the girl back home."

Jack and Jill
Assuming that other servicemen had similar problems receiving mail from the folks back home, Jill conceived a radio program that featured recorded music and friendly talk. Officials in the United States Office of War Information approved the idea, and the Jack and Jill show was born featuring Jill and her husband. When he entered the Army, Jill began doing the program as a solo host. The show was broadcast from San Francisco via shortwave radio. An article in Yank, the Army Weekly noted, "For a long time, Army authorities admit, Jill's program was the only link the men at Guadal[canal] had with the folks back home."

In addition to popular recordings of the time, Jill's broadcasts included birth announcements and her reading letters to military men from their wives. Eventually, AFRS officials realized the popularity of Jill's program and moved her to Los Angeles, where she began broadcasting GI Jive daily over 400 Army radio stations.

GI Jive
Jill, with her commentary and records, was sometimes called "America's answer to Tokyo Rose" and Axis Sally but Jill said later that was not the point because American servicemen did not take broadcasters like Tokyo Rose and Axis Sally seriously. "Our men — those who listened to enemy propaganda — only listened because there was nothing else to do," she said.

In his memoir, An American Adventure: From Early Aviation through Three Wars to the White House, diplomat and National Security Council member William Lloyd Stearman reflected on hearing Jill during his time in the Navy: "GI Jill ... did so much to bolster our morale. She came across like a wholesome girl-next-door who began each radio show with 'Hi-ya, fellas! This is GI Jill with the GI Jive.' ... We all loved her."

Jill's rapport with listeners went beyond the 15 minutes of each broadcast. As servicemen wrote letters asking her to play certain records, she tried to reply to each letter she received, answering as many as 500 letters per week, including a photograph of herself with her letter.

Interaction went both ways as some listeners sent Jill pictures of themselves, leading her to comment, "I think I was the only person in the world who had pinup boys." Some even sent her hand-made trinkets like a bracelet fashioned from a crashed airplane's broken window and a crudely inscribed heart-shaped pendant saying, "To Jill from Lou, 1944". Most of the letters and photographs that she received were destroyed when her family's house in Hollywood burned.

Jill's success led to a spin-off program of sorts when Virginia C. Claudon Allen was trained to broadcast in India to counteract broadcasts of Radio Tokyo. Allen "was sometimes referred to as the GI Jill of India." The original Jill eventually began a second program, AEF Jukebox.

Personal life
Martha Wilkerson married Mort Werner on March 18, 1939. At that time, she worked at radio station KMTR in Los Angeles, California, and he was program director there. They have two daughters.

In the mid-1960s, Wilkerson and Werner, who was by then a vice president at NBC, lived in Scarsdale, New York with their teenage daughter. Reflecting on her experiences in broadcasting, the ex-disc jockey called her work as GI Jill, "the most important thing I've ever done in my life."

Mort Werner died in 1990. Martha Wilkerson Werner died in 1999.

References 

 

American radio DJs
1918 births
1999 deaths
American women radio presenters
American women civilians in World War II